Pablo Rodríguez Regordosa (born 23 March 1970) is a Mexican politician from the National Action Party. From 2009 to 2011 he served as Deputy of the LXI Legislature of the Mexican Congress representing Puebla.

References

1970 births
Living people
People from Puebla (city)
National Action Party (Mexico) politicians
21st-century Mexican politicians
Politicians from Puebla
Deputies of the LXI Legislature of Mexico
Members of the Chamber of Deputies (Mexico) for Puebla